William Alonzo Barber (January 11, 1843 – February 16, 1913) was a member of the Wisconsin State Assembly.

Biography
Barber was born on January 11, 1843, in Saratoga County, New York and moved to Wisconsin in 1856. During the American Civil War, he served with the 37th Wisconsin Volunteer Infantry Regiment of the Union Army. Other jobs he held include merchant, banker, partner of lumber firm, teacher and Director of Wayland Academy.

On April 9, 1867, Barber married Mary Lawton. They had two children. Barber was a Baptist.

Barber died in 1913 at his home in Warrens, Wisconsin.

Political career
Barber was a member of the Assembly in 1882. Other positions he held include postmaster of Warrens, Wisconsin. He was a Republican.

References

People from Galway, New York
People from Monroe County, Wisconsin
Politicians from Beaver Dam, Wisconsin
Republican Party members of the Wisconsin State Assembly
Wisconsin postmasters
20th-century Baptists
People of Wisconsin in the American Civil War
Schoolteachers from Wisconsin
Businesspeople in timber
American bankers
American merchants
1843 births
1913 deaths
Baptists from New York (state)
Educators from New York (state)
19th-century American businesspeople
American school administrators